Vadakkumkara is a village in the Mukundapuram taluka of the Thrissur district of India, with an area of 605 hectares and harbouring 1814 households with total population of 7075 as per the 2011 Census. The nearest town Chalakudy is at a distance of 15 km. Male population is 3291 and female population is 3784. Scheduled Caste Population is 1126 and Scheduled Tribes population is 1. Census Location Code of the village is 627911.

Literacy   
 Total literate population: 6244 (88.25%)
 Literate male population: 2941 (89.36%)
 Literate female population: 3303 (87.29%)

Educational Facilities   
There is 1 private Pre-primary School in the village.
There are 2 government Primary Schools in the village. There is 1 private Primary School in the village.
There is 1 government Middle School in the village. There is 1 private Middle School in the village.
There is 1 government Secondary School in the village. There is 1 private Secondary School in the village.
There is 1 private Senior Secondary School in the village.
The nearest Degree College of Arts and Science and Commerce Irinjalakuda is at a distance of less than 4 km from the village.
The nearest Engineering College  is at a distance of 5 to  km from the village.
The nearest Medical College (Thrissur) is at a distance of 27 0 km from the village.
The nearest Management Institute (Kuruvilassery) is at a distance of 15 km from the village.
The nearest Polytechnic (Kallettumkara) is at a distance of 10 km from the village.
The nearest Vocational Training School (Kuruvilassery) is at a distance of less than 15 km from the village.
The nearest Non-formal Training Centre (Thrissur) is at a distance of more than 10 km from the village.
The nearest Special School for Disabled is at a distance of 5 to 10 km from the village.

Irrigation facilities 
Sources of irrigation are as follows (area in hectares):
 Canals: 93
 Wells/Tube-wells: 220
 Tanks/Lakes: 0
 Water Falls: 0
 Others: 0

Manufacturing 
Vadakkumkara is engaged in the manufacture of following items (in decreasing order of importance): Paddy, Spices, arecanut.

Sustainable development 
A programme has been going on since August 2014 for the integrated eco-friendly sustainable development of the Vellangallur Panchayat by Salim Ali Foundation and the Vellangallur Panchayat with a partial grant from Manappuram Foundation.

References 

Cities and towns in Thrissur district